is a Japanese football player. He plays for Kashiwa Reysol.

Career
Taiyo Koga joined J1 League club Kashiwa Reysol in 2017.

Club statistics
Updated to end of 2018 season.

National team statistics

References

External links
Profile at Kashiwa Reysol

1998 births
Living people
Association football people from Niigata Prefecture
Japanese footballers
J1 League players
Kashiwa Reysol players
Association football defenders
Japan international footballers